Sexual slang is a set of linguistic terms and phrases used to refer to sexual organs, processes, and activities; they are generally considered colloquial rather than formal or medical, and some may be seen as impolite or improper.

Related to sexual slang is slang related to defecation and flatulence (toilet humor, scatolinguistics). References to the anal tract are often given a sexual connotation in the context of anal sex (in particular, in a context of male homosexuality).

While popular usage is extremely versatile in coining ever new short-lived synonyms, old terms with originally no pejorative colouring may come to be considered inappropriate over time. Thus, terms like arse/ass, cunt, cock and fuck should not be considered "slang," since they are the inherited common English terms for their referents, but they are often considered vulgarisms and are replaced by euphemisms or scientific terminology in "polite" language.

Pejorative usage

Terms of disparagement are used to refer to members of a given sexual minority, gender, sex, or sexual orientation in a derogatory or pejorative manner. They are used as insults by persons who are not or do not wish to be associated with the group being disparaged. For example, queer can be used as an insult by those seeking to deprecate homosexual, bisexual, and transgender or transsexual people, but the word has also undergone reclaiming, such that it can be used positively within that community. Which terms are used as slurs is determined by a society's or subculture's set of values, especially its biases against genders (sexism). For example, words such as whore and slut are typically used to refer to sexually promiscuous women.
 
Sexual slurs are common across many cultures and historical periods. The most common slurs directed against men historically include accusations of being a passive homosexual (Aristophanes notably enjoyed using such allusions) or of being effeminate; for example, in the Hittite military oath, oath-breakers are threatened with being made into women (a promise of either actual castration, or of divine revenge on the traitors' manhood).
The pejorative term prick for a contemptible person is also usually used for men.

Sexual slang and humor 
In the popular jargon of many cultures, the use of sexual slang is a form of humor or euphemism that often creates controversy over its public use. Sexual humor has been seen in many circles as crude and unsophisticated, as well as insulting towards the subject it describes. Sexual slang has a long history in literature and comedy: examples from Shakespeare are well-known. The popularity of contemporary comedians who indulge in sexual humor, from George Carlin to Andrew Dice Clay, reflects the appeal of this form of speech. It is often seen as a form of taboo, in which much of the appeal lies in the shock value of daring to speak "forbidden" words in public.

See also

 Baseball metaphors for sex

References

Further reading
 
 
 
 
 Heidepeter, Philipp; Reutner, Ursula. "When Humour Questions Taboo: A Typology of Twisted Euphemism Use", in: Pragmatics & Cognition 28/1, 138–166. ISSN 0929-0907.

External links

 The Online Slang Dictionary—thesaurus containing terms related to sexuality

 
Euphemisms
Profanity